Her-do-Gher (Urdu/Pothwari: ہردوگہر) is a village to the east of Sihala, Pakistan. It lies beside Kahuta Road and is split into two parts by the Soan River.

It comprises 07 Mohallahs (neighbourhoods); namely Dhoke Qazian, Gher Rajgan, Paran Gher, Chhal, Nai Abadi, Gharhi and Dandi. The main crops cultivated here are wheat and maize. 

Union councils of Islamabad Capital Territory
Villages in Islamabad Capital Territory